Dominic Paul DiMaggio (February 12, 1917 – May 8, 2009), nicknamed "The Little Professor", was an American Major League Baseball center fielder. He played his entire 11-year baseball career for the Boston Red Sox (1940–1953). DiMaggio was the youngest of three brothers who each became major league center fielders, the others being Joe and Vince.

In 1959, DiMaggio joined forces with nine other New Englanders, led by Billy Sullivan, to found and capitalize a Boston American football team that debuted in 1960 as the AFL's Boston Patriots.

Biography
An effective leadoff hitter, he batted .300 four times and led the American League in runs twice and in triples and stolen bases once each. He also led AL center fielders in assists three times and in putouts and double plays twice each; he tied a league record by recording 400 putouts four times, and his 1948 totals of 503 putouts and 526 total chances stood as AL records for nearly 30 years. His 1,338 games in center field ranked eighth in AL history at his retirement. His 34-game hitting streak in 1949 remains a record for the major-league Red Sox.

He was the youngest of three brothers who grew up in North Beach, San Francisco and who had each become major league center fielders: Joe was a star with the rival New York Yankees, and Vince played for five National League teams. The youngest of nine children born to Sicilian immigrants, Dom's small stature (5'9") and eyeglasses earned him the nickname "The Little Professor."

After breaking into the minor leagues in 1937 with the San Francisco Seals of the Pacific Coast League, Dom DiMaggio's contract was purchased by the Red Sox following a 1939 season in which he batted .361; he hit .301 in his  rookie season, becoming part of a .300-hitting outfield with Ted Williams and Doc Cramer. In both 1941 and 1942 he scored over 100 runs to finish third in the AL, and was among the league's top ten players in doubles and steals; he was named an All-Star both years. Batting third, he hit only .259 in the 1946 World Series against the St. Louis Cardinals, but was almost a Series hero for Boston. With two out in the eighth inning of Game 7, he doubled to drive in two runs, tying the score 3-3; but he pulled his hamstring coming into second base, and had to be removed for a pinch runner. The result was costly, as Harry Walker doubled to center field in the bottom of the inning, with Enos Slaughter scoring from first base in his famed "Mad Dash" to win the game and Series for St. Louis; had DiMaggio remained in the game, Walker's hit might have been catchable, or the outfielder's strong arm might have held Slaughter to third base. "If they hadn't taken DiMaggio out of the game", Slaughter later said of his daring sprint, "I wouldn't have tried it."

After an offensively disappointing year in 1947, DiMaggio rebounded in 1948 to score 127 runs (second in the AL) with career highs in doubles (40), runs batted in (87) and walks (101). His 503 putouts broke Baby Doll Jacobson's AL record of 484, set with the  St. Louis Browns; his 526 total chances surpassed the league mark of 498 shared by Sam Rice of the  Washington Senators and Jacobson. At the time, the marks ranked behind only Taylor Douthit's totals of 547 and 566 with the  Cardinals in major league history; both records stood until , when Chet Lemon of the Chicago White Sox recorded 512 putouts and 536 total chances. In 1949 DiMaggio batted .307 with 126 runs, and had his team-record 34-game hitting streak; ironically, the streak was ended on August 9 by an outstanding catch made by his brother Joe.

In , DiMaggio led the AL in runs (131), triples (11) and stolen bases (15) while hitting a career-high .328.  On June 30, he and Joe hit home runs while playing against one another, becoming the fourth pair of brothers to homer in the same game. Dom's stolen base total of 15 is the lowest stolen base total to lead either of the Major Leagues in a single season. In August of that year, he had 53 base hits, tying a club record with teammate Johnny Pesky.

He retired in May , after appearing in only three games that year as a pinch hitter, with a .298 batting average, 1680 hits, 308 doubles, 57 triples, 87 home runs, 1046 runs and 618 RBI in 1399 games. He was selected an All-Star seven times (1941–42, 1946, 1949–52). His career average of 2.98 chances per game remains the record for AL outfielders.

DiMaggio enjoyed a close friendship with teammates Ted Williams, Bobby Doerr, and Johnny Pesky, which was chronicled in David Halberstam's book The Teammates. After retiring, he became a plastics manufacturer in New England. He and his wife Emily, whom he married in 1948, had two sons (Paul and Peter), a daughter (Emily), and several grandchildren (Alex, Andrew, Charlotte, Margel, Peter, and Anna).

In a 1976 Esquire magazine article, sportswriter Harry Stein published an "All Time All-Star Argument Starter", consisting of five ethnic baseball teams. Dom DiMaggio was the left fielder on Stein's Italian team.

In 1979, he was named a member of the Board of Trustees at Saint Anselm College in Goffstown, New Hampshire. He served under college president Fr. Jonathan DeFelice and helped lead Saint Anselm College through four decades of expansion. He was awarded an honorary degree by the college in 1981, and his wife Emily received one in 1999.

Writer David Halberstam described Dom as "probably the most underrated player of his day."

Military service
After the 1942 season, DiMaggio enlisted in the United States Navy with initial service at Naval Station Treasure Island in San Francisco, California. He deployed to Australia and the Philippines during World War II. While stationed in Australia, he and Phil Rizzuto flew to Honolulu to play in the 1944 
Army–Navy World Series. He also played for the Norfolk Naval Training Station team. He was discharged in 1945 as a chief petty officer.

Death

DiMaggio died on May 8, 2009, at his home in Marion, Massachusetts. He was 92 years old and had been suffering from pneumonia. His requiem mass was celebrated by his friend Fr. Jonathan DeFelice at St. Paul's Catholic Church in Wellesley, Massachusetts.

See also 
Bay Area Sports Hall of Fame
List of Boston Red Sox team records
List of Major League Baseball career runs scored leaders
List of Major League Baseball annual runs scored leaders
List of Major League Baseball annual stolen base leaders
List of Major League Baseball annual triples leaders
List of Major League Baseball players who spent their entire career with one franchise

References

Further reading 
 2 July 2001 Sports Illustrated article Archived October 11, 2008
 AP Obituary in The Boston Globe

External links 

 
 

1917 births
2009 deaths
Sportspeople from Plymouth County, Massachusetts
Baseball players from Massachusetts
Baseball players from San Francisco
American League All-Stars
American people of Italian descent
United States Navy personnel of World War II
American League stolen base champions
Boston Red Sox players
Deaths from pneumonia in Massachusetts
Major League Baseball center fielders
Pacific Coast League MVP award winners
People from Marion, Massachusetts
United States Navy chiefs
Sportspeople of Italian descent